Ian Wallace (born 1950) is a Canadian  illustrator and writer. He was born in Niagara Falls, Ontario.

Wallace attended the  Ontario College of Art.

Works
As writer and illustrator
The Sleeping Porch (Groundwood Books, Jul 2008)
The Huron Carol (Groundwood, Aug 2006)
The Man Who Walked the Earth (Groundwood, Aug 2003)
The Naked Lady (Roaring Brook, Oct 2002)
The True Story of Trapper Jack's Left Big Toe (Roaring Brook, Apr 2002)
Duncan's Way (Dorling Kindersley, Mar 2000)
Boy of the Deeps (Dorling Kindersley, Mar 1999)
A Winter's Tale (Groundwood, Aug 1997)
Mr. Kneebone's New Digs (Douglas & McIntyre, Feb 1991)
Morgan the Magnificent (Margaret K. McElderry, Jun 1987)
Chin Chiang and the Dragon's Dance (Groundwood, Nov 1984)

As illustrator
Sarah and the People of Sand River,  by W. D. Valgardson (Groundwood, Aug 1996)
Hansel and Gretel, (Groundwood, Mar 1996), from the Brothers Grimm tale "Hansel and Gretel" [1812]
The Mummer's Song, by Bud Davidge (1993)
The Name of the Tree: A Bantu Tale Retold, by Celia Barker Lottridge (1989)
Architect of the Moon, by Tim Wynne-Jones (Groundwood, 1988)
Very Last First Time, by Jan Andrews (1985)
The Sandwich, with Angela Wood (Kids Can, 1975)
Canadian Railroad Trilogy, by Gordon Lightfoot (1967)

References

External links

 
 Ian Wallace  at the Canadian Society of Children's Authors, Illustrators, and Performers (CANSCAIP.org)
 

1950 births
Living people
Canadian children's book illustrators
Canadian children's writers
Writers from Ontario
Date of birth missing (living people)